The 20098 season is the Puerto Rico Islanders 5th season in the USL First Division. This article shows player statistics and all matches (official and friendly) that the club had during the 2008 season. It also includes matched played in 2008 for the CONCACAF Champions League 2008–09.

Club

Management

Kit 

|
|
|

Competitions

Overall

USL 1

Results summary

Results by round (Regular season)

Result by brackets (Playoffs) 

Teams will be re-seeded for semifinal matchups

2008
Puerto Rico Islanders
Islanders